Boldtville is an unincorporated community in Bexar County, in the U.S. state of Texas. According to the Handbook of Texas, the community had a population of 20 in 2000. It is located within the Greater San Antonio metropolitan area.

History
The area in what is known as Boldtville today was first settled sometime before the 1870s and went by the name Calaveras. Local settlers in the area had the surnames Adams, Avery, Blandford, Boldt, Duke, Gembler, and Vasbinder. Henry Klondike Stuckenberg owned and operated a general store in the early 1900s. Reverend Baxter D.D. Greer led the Calaveras Presbyterian church, which was organized in 1909. The community was renamed Boldtville for local blacksmith Albert F. Boldt and his family. He also donated a plot of land to build a church atop in 1950 which was officially organized as Boldtville Community Presbyterian Church on October 26, 1952. Ed and Ruby Avery owned and operated a general store that became a meeting place for residents until it closed in 1979. Its population was 20 in 2000 with a membership of 100 at the local church.

Geography

Education
C. Henry Echterhoff donated  of land for a school to be built atop on October 12, 1891, with Albert F. Boldt, Louis Brehm, and Joe E. Halbardier serving as trustees. Union Sunday School was organized in 1908. Two other school board trustees, Robert Uecker and Joe Halbardier, Sr., alongside Boldt, visited some of the newer schools in the county and wanted to add another school to the community. Boldt donated an acre of land for the new school. It was built by Fritz Gembler and opened in 1919, serving students in first through eighth grades. It remained in operation until 1960 and was used for many purposes, such as a community center, a church, and a storage place. East Central Independent School District superintendent Anthony Costanzo lobbied to renovate the building as the district's new administration complex in 1980. It received a Texas State Historical Marker when it was restored in 1984. Former alumni held a reunion and collected souvenirs and artifacts related to the school to build a museum to honor the community and 18 other schools in the county. It opened on January 12, 1986, and became the site of school board meetings. The community continues to be served by the East Central ISD today.

References

Unincorporated communities in Bexar County, Texas
Unincorporated communities in Texas
Greater San Antonio